Saint Victoria may refer to:

Victoria of Albitina (feast day: February 11)
Victoria, Anatolia, and Audax (feast day: December 23)
Victoria, 1st-century martyr (see Saint Edistus)
Victoria, 4th-century martyr, sister of Saint Acisclus
Victoria, 5th-century African martyr, martyred with Denise, Dativa, Leontia, Tertius, Emilianus, Boniface, Majoricus, and Servus

See also 
 Victoria (disambiguation)
 Santa Vittoria (disambiguation)